Cosmopterix argentitegulella is a moth of the family Cosmopterigidae. It is known from Russia (Amur and Primorye regions) and China (Jiangxi).

The length of the forewings is about 6 mm.

References

argentitegulella
Moths described in 1985